The 2017 Evergreen Premier League (referred to as the EPLWA) was the fourth season of the Evergreen Premier League. The season began on 30 April 2017.

Eight clubs participated. Wenatchee FC folded and Oly Town FC joined the league in 2017.

League table

Results

References

2017
1